Mary Estus Jones Webb (May 14, 1924 – September 16, 1995) became Mayor-President of Baton Rouge in 1955 on the death of her husband, Jesse L. Webb Jr. in a plane crash.  She was the first woman to serve as Mayor-President of Baton Rouge.

Early life
Webb was born in Columbia, Louisiana on May 14, 1924, to James Melton Jones and Hattie Estus Head. She married Jesse Lynn Webb and they had four children.

Tenure as Mayor-President
Her husband was only 29 when he was elected Mayor-President of Baton Rouge in 1952.  Three years later, he died when the aircraft he was flying in crashed while on final approach at Lansing, Michigan.  The City Council chose Mrs. Webb to serve as caretaker Mayor-President for the balance of her husband's term.  She did not seek election in her own right in 1956.

Later years
She served as Sigma Pi Fraternity housemother at Louisiana State University for many years.  Webb died on September 16, 1995, and was buried at Roselawn Cemetery in Baton Rouge.

References

1924 births
1995 deaths
Mayors of Baton Rouge, Louisiana
Women mayors of places in Louisiana
Women in Louisiana politics
Louisiana State University people
People from Columbia, Louisiana
20th-century American politicians
20th-century American women politicians